The Gallinas people are an ethnic group in Liberia, which formerly existed as an independent kingdom.

In 1868 and 1869, the Liberian government raided the chiefdoms of the Gbenmah and Gallinas.

In 1882, the king and chiefs of Gallinas ceded a piece of coastal territory to the British government.

Kings and chiefs of the Gallinas people 
King Siaka was king of the Gallinas in 1840, when Joseph Denman contacted him as regards the plight of Fry Norman, a Black British woman who he understood had been seized by Siacca's son Prince Manna.

Another prominent ruler was King Momulu Massaquoi, whose descendants constitute the contemporary royal family.

References

Ethnic groups in Liberia